Tsili is a 2014 drama film directed by Amos Gitai and based on the novel of the same name by Aharon Appelfeld. It was screened at the 71st Venice International Film Festival in an out of competition slot.

Cast 
 Sarah Adler as Tsili 
 Meshi Olinski as Young Tsili
 Adam Tsekhman as Marek 
 Lea Koenig
 Andrey Kashkar
 Yelena Yaralova

References

External links 
 

2014 films
2014 drama films
Yiddish-language films
Israeli drama films
Russian drama films
Italian drama films
French drama films
Holocaust films
Films directed by Amos Gitai
Ukrainian-language films
2010s Polish-language films
2010s German-language films
2010s Russian-language films
2014 multilingual films
Israeli multilingual films
Russian multilingual films
Italian multilingual films
French multilingual films
2010s French films